The sex-positive movement is a social and philosophical movement that seeks to change cultural attitudes and norms around sexuality, promoting the recognition of sexuality (in the countless forms of expression) as a natural and healthy part of the human experience and emphasizing the importance of personal sovereignty, safer sex practices, and consensual sex (free from violence or coercion). It covers every aspect of sexual identity including gender expression, orientation, relationship to the body (body-positivity, nudity, choice), relationship-style choice, and reproductive rights. Sex-positivity is "an attitude towards human sexuality that regards all consensual sexual activities as fundamentally healthy and pleasurable, encouraging sexual pleasure and experimentation." The sex-positive movement also advocates for comprehensive sex education and safe sex as part of its campaign. The movement generally makes no moral distinctions among types of sexual activities, regarding these choices as matters of personal preference.

Overview
The terms and concepts of sex-positive (German: sexuell positiv) (or, alternately sex-affirmative (sexuell bejahend)) and sex-negative (sexuell negativ) are generally attributed to Wilhelm Reich. His hypothesis was that some societies view the sexual expression as essentially good and healthy, while others have a generally negative view of sexuality and seek to repress and control libido. Other terms used to describe this concept include pro-sex or pro-sexuality.The sex-positive movement does not, in general, make moral or ethical distinctions between heterosexual or homosexual sex, or masturbation, regarding these choices as matters of personal preference. Other sex-positive positions include acceptance of BDSM and polyamory as well as asexuality. The sex-positive movement is also concerned with the teaching of comprehensive and accurate sex education in schools.Some sex-positive theorists have analyzed sex-positivity in terms of the intersection of race/culture, gender, sexuality, class, nationality, and spirituality. Because of the vastness of the sex-positivity movement, it has been challenging for people to reach an agreed-upon definition of the term "sex-positivity". Several definitions of sex-positivity have been offered by sexologist Carol Queen:Sex-positive, a term that's coming into cultural awareness, isn't a dippy love-child celebration of orgone – it's a simple yet radical affirmation that we each grow our own passions on a different medium, that instead of having two or three or even half a dozen sexual orientations, we should be thinking in terms of millions. "Sex-positive" respects each of our unique sexual profiles, even as we acknowledge that some of us have been damaged by a culture that tries to eradicate sexual differences and possibilities.It’s the cultural philosophy that understands sexuality as a potentially positive force in one’s life, and it can, of course, be contrasted with sex-negativity, which sees sex as problematic, disruptive, and dangerous. Sex-positivity allows for and in fact celebrates sexual diversity, differing desires and relationships structures, and individual choices based on consent.

History
Main articles: 1960s counterculture, Free Love and Sexual revolution

In general use, the term sexual liberation is used to describe a socio-political movement, witnessed from the 1960s into the 1970s. However, the term has been used at least since the late 1920s and is often attributed as being influenced by Freud's writing on sexual liberation and psychosexual issues, as well as Wilhelm Reich, who originally coined the term.

During the 1960s, a shift in the ways people thought about sexuality began to take place, heralding a period of de-conditioning in some circles away from old world antecedents, and developing new codes of sexual behavior, many of which have since been integrated into the mainstream.

The 1960s also heralded a new culture of "free love" with millions of young people embracing the hippie ethos and preaching the power of love and the beauty of sex as a natural part of ordinary life. Hippies believed that sex and sexuality were natural biological phenomena that should be neither denied nor repressed. Changes in attitudes reflected a perception that traditional views on sexuality were both hypocritical and male-chauvinistic.

Sexual liberalization heralded a new ethos in experimenting with open sex in and outside of marriage, contraception and the pill, public nudity, gay liberation, legalized abortion, interracial marriage, a return to natural childbirth, women's rights, and feminism.

Historian David Allyn argues that the sexual revolution was a time of "coming-out": about premarital sex, masturbation, erotic fantasies, pornography use, and sexuality.

The term sex-positive first came into use in the United States in the late 1990s with the founding of the Center for Sex and Culture in San Francisco, California, and The Center for Sex Positive Culture in Seattle, Washington. In 2009, Sex Positive World began in Portland, Oregon. As of 2019, there are more than sixteen chapters of the nonprofit, in five countries.

Sex-positive feminism 

Sex-positive feminism, also known as pro-sex feminism, sex-radical feminism, or sexually liberal feminism, is a movement that began in the early 1980s. Some became involved in the sex-positive feminist movement in response to efforts by anti-pornography feminists, such as Catharine MacKinnon, Andrea Dworkin, Robin Morgan and Dorchen Leidholdt, to put pornography at the center of a feminist explanation of women's oppression. This period of intense debate and acrimony between sex-positive and anti-pornography feminists during the early 1980s is often referred to as the "Feminist Sex Wars". Other sex-positive feminists became involved, not in opposition to other feminists, but in direct response to what they saw as patriarchal control of sexuality. Some authors who have advocated sex-positive feminism include Erika Lust, Ellen Willis, Susie Bright, Patrick Califia, Gayle Rubin, Carol Queen, Avedon Carol, Tristan Taormino, Diana Cage, Nina Hartley, and Betty Dodson.

Sex-positive feminism gives attention and acknowledges the importance of women's right to explore their bodies, sexual desire, and considers that sexual violence does not have to prevent the vindication of female desire. This movement demands the preservation of freedom and is against norms that are present in the sexual sphere. It also encourages and demands respect for variety and sexual dissidence without allowing itself to be harmed by intense anti-sex pressure from critics.

Sex-positive feminism affirms that the discourse on women's sexual pleasure is silenced and marginalized in today's world. Suppressing sexual dialogue with the supposed purpose of protecting women will only make them appear, according to this perspective, as the weaker sex. Women could have difficulty defending themselves with the classification as victims. Over time, women have been classified as sexually passive, while men are recognized as sexually aggressive, so intercourse is considered an activity in which women "submit" to men's desire. Another factor that continues to minimize female desire is the lack of consensus and research on it, a product of the social repression that women have had to endure over the centuries, which has led to prejudices and generalizations.

The sexual hierarchy system places heterosexuality, marriage and procreation at the top, which causes many women to fear the sexual system that predominates in today's world. Pleasure and sexuality are human rights that have been subjugated by an old-fashioned patriarchal social construction. Pro-sex feminism endeavors to cultivate sexuality as a site of political resistance. By using the "pleasure" factor in their favor, a significant contribution to the contemporary queer theory and politics has been made by using sexual and feminist "empowerment."

Opposition 
In opposition, some feminists believe sex-positivity perceives disadvantage in women but makes them easier to oppress. A large religious–particularly Abrahamic—conservative opposition to sex-positivity sees human sexuality as a destructive force except under the contract of a marriage. Sexual acts are ranked hierarchically, with marital heterosexuality at the top of the hierarchy and masturbation, homosexuality, and other sexualities that deviate from societal expectations closer to the bottom. Medicine and psychiatry are said to have also contributed to sex-negativity, as they may designate some forms of sexuality that appear on the bottom of this hierarchy as being pathological (see Mental illness).

Multiple feminists, such as Verkerk, Glick, and Bauer have criticized iterations of sex-positivity due to concerns about its effectiveness in challenging patriarchal norms. The aforementioned feminists insist they are "sex-critical" rather than "sex-negative". Scholar, Verkerk, acknowledges this by stating that "there are both harmful and liberating aspects of female sexual objectification and an accurate account of it must consider both. Critics also take issue with the commodification of sexuality. Women are told both to invest in western standards of beauty and sexualization while also becoming a "consumable objects themselves.' Sex-positive feminism has also been criticized for its emphasis on defeating the patriarchal gender norms through personal life choices, "rather than to dismantle, critique, expose, or challenge systematic discrimination and violence.

The SlutWalk received criticism of its efficacy as an activist event. SlutWalk's purpose was to reclaim the word "slut" and counteract victim-blaming. Despite the aim of the slut-walk, critics point out that the word "slut" had not been reclaimed. Rather, the word slut had become reified. Critics of the SlutWalk also suggest that the focus on revealing clothing "ultimately displace[s] the sombre and deadly issues of rape, domestic violence, sexual abuse, and street harassment." Lastly, the SlutWalk received criticism for lack of consideration of the hyper-sexualization that women of colour face. Black Women's Blueprint penned an open letter to the slut-walk explaining that Black women cannot "afford to label" themselves as those in the slut-walk do.

In the 21st century 
Since the early 2000s, the sex-positivity movement has continued to move closer into the mainstream. The advent of social media has made the sex-positivity movement more accessible by giving advocates of the movement platforms to promote their beliefs to a wide audience of followers. By extending the reach of the movement, sex-positivity has come to be inclusive of all sorts of sex and sexuality. Shaming has become an area of particular interest within the sex-positivity movement, encouraging people to be more open and accepting of the different experiences people have with sex and sexuality. Slut-shaming, prude-shaming and kink-shaming have all been challenged by the sex-positivity movement in an effort to allow all people to feel supported by and included in the movement.

Pop culture has also played a large role in bringing the sex-positivity movement into the mainstream. Celebrities, including Lady Gaga, Amber Rose, Jessica Biel, Cameron Diaz, Taylor Swift and many others, have spoken publicly about their experiences with slut-shaming, sexuality, sexual assault, body acceptance and overall sexual health and responsibility.

In recent years, sex-positive concepts have found their way into dance clubs through sex-positive parties in cities like Berlin and Vienna.

See also

 Center for Sex Positive Culture
 Comprehensive sex education
 Decriminalization of sex work
 Free love
 Free the nipple
 Positive youth development
 Relationship anarchy
 Right to sexuality
 Sex workers' rights
 Sexecology
 Sex-positive feminism
 Sexual and reproductive health and rights
 Sexual revolution
 Topfreedom

References

 
Philosophy of sexuality
Sexuality and society